Giovanni Gaetano Orsini may refer to:

Pope Nicholas III (died 1280), born Giovanni Gaetano Orsini
Giovanni Gaetano Orsini (died 1335), cardinal-nephew of Pope Nicholas III